Golpayegan (also known as Shahr-e Golpāyegān meaning "City of Golpayegan")  is a city and capital of Golpayegan County, Isfahan Province, Iran. At the 2006 census, its population was 217,849, in 44,263 families. Its temperature fluctuates between +37° and -10° Celsius. Its average annual rainfall is 300 mm.

Land of tulips 
Historically, the name of the town has been recorded as Vartpadegān, Jorfadeghan, Darbayagan, Kuhpayegan, and Golbādagān. Golpayegan means "fortress of flowers" and "land of tulips". According to Ḥamd-Allāh Mostawfi, the town of Golpāyegān was built by the daughter of Bahman, named Samra, also known as Homāy Bente Bahman in Persian.

History 

After Parsadan Gorgijanidze was dismissed from his post as prefect (darugheh) of Isfahan, he was appointed as the new eshik-agha (Master of Ceremonies) and given five villages in the confines of Golpayegan as a fief by king (shah) Abbas II (r. 1642-1666).
Historically, the name of the town has been recorded as Karbāyagān; Jarbāḏaqān; Darbāyagān; and Golbādagān. Golpayegan Kebab is unique and made from endemic cows, it is registered in Iranian intagible heritage list.

Climate 
Golpayegan has a cold semi-arid climate (Köppen BSk).

Historical monuments 

Several historical monuments are located in the Jāme' mosque of Golpayegan ("The Congregational Mosque"), a minaret (Manār) from the Seljuk period, the Sarāvar mosque from the 15th-16th centuries, as well as the Hevdah Tan shrine from the 17th century, Gouged Stronghold, the stronghold was used as a caravansary, but during the war time or when the bandits attacked, it was used as a castle.

Gallery

References

Sources

Paghava, I., Turkia S., Akopyan A. (2010), "The cross-in-circle mark on the silver coins of the Safavid ruler, Sultān Husayn, from the Iravān mint", Journal of the Oriental Numismatic Society 202

External links 

 ' Hamneshine Bahar: Golpayegan (golpayegun) shahre lalehaye vajgun همنشین بهار: گلپایگان (گلپایکون)، شهر لاله‌های واژگون  
 Golpayegan Dam
 Golpayegan Dam . map
 Hamneshine Bahar :   Golpayegan (video) 
 The News Golpayeganiha
 The News Golpapress

Populated places in Golpayegan County
Cities in Isfahan Province